I Told You I Was Freaky is the second studio album by New Zealand folk parody duo Flight of the Conchords. It features 13 songs. Out of those 13, ten were released as singles on the American iTunes Store following their television debut. It was released on 20 October 2009 in the US and 2 November in the UK. One of the songs, "Demon Woman", was released as part of a downloadable track pack for the video game Rock Band.

Track listing

Personnel
 Arj Barker: rap on "Sugalumps" and "Too Many Dicks (On the Dance Floor)"
 Gus Seyffert: guitar on "We're Both in Love With a Sexy Lady"
 Josh Schwarz: guitar on "Demon Woman"
 David Ralicke: bass clarinet on "Rambling Through the Avenues of Time"
 Kristen Schaal & David Costabile: vocals on "Petrov, Yelyena, and Me"
 Shani Meivar: violin on "Petrov, Yelyena, and Me"
 Sam Scott: percussion on "Petrov, Yelyena, and Me"
 Mickey Petralia: drums on "You Don't Have to Be a Prostitute"
 Rhys Darby: vocals on "Friends"
 Jim Gaffigan: vocals on "Friends"
 Alison Sudol, Inara George, & Nadia Ackerman: vocals on "Carol Brown"
 Jo Bobin & Victoria Bobin: vocals on "Carol Brown" and "Angels"
 Jamie Simpson: vocals on "Angels"
 Sia Furler: Backing vocals on "Carol Brown" and "You Don't Have to Be a Prostitute"

Charts

References

2009 albums
Flight of the Conchords albums
Anti-folk albums
Albums with cover art by John Dyer Baizley
Sub Pop albums
Alternative hip hop albums
2000s comedy albums
Albums produced by Mickey Petralia